A capitalist is a supporter of the economic system of capitalism.

Capitalist may also refer to:

Business
 Business magnate or capitalist, a person who has achieved great success through capital investments
 Venture capitalist or capitalist, a person that makes capital investments for an equity stake in a company

Other uses
 Capitalist, a member of the Norwegian Capitalist Party
 Capitalist, a member of the Capitalist Party of South Africa
 Capitalist (horse), a retired thoroughbred racehorse

See also 
 
 

 Capitalism (disambiguation)